Colina is a genus of sea snails, marine gastropod mollusks in the family Cerithiidae.

Species
Species within the genus Colina include:
 Colina arifi Bozzetti, 2011 
 Colina ciclostoma Bozzetti, 2008
 Colina lorenzi Bozzetti, 2018
 Colina macrostoma (Hinds, 1844)
 Colina madagascariensis Bozzetti, 2008
 Colina pinguis (A. Adams, 1855)
 Colina selecta Melvill & Standen, 1898
 Synonyms 
 Subgenus Colina (Ischnocerithium) Thiele, 1929: synonym of Cerithium Bruguière, 1789
 Colina (Ischnocerithium) rostrata (A. Adams in G.B. Sowerby II, 1855) : synonym of Cerithium rostratum A. Adams in G.B. Sowerby II, 1855
 Colina perimensis Jousseaume, 1931: synonym of Colina pinguis (A. Adams, 1855)
 Colina pupiformis A. Adams, 1854 : synonym of Colina macrostoma (Hinds, 1844)
 Colina pygmaea H. Adams, 1867 : synonym of Colina macrostoma (Hinds, 1844)
Nomen dubium
 Colina gracilis H. Adams, 1866 (nomen dubium)

References

External links
 Adams H. & Adams A. (1853-1858). The genera of Recent Mollusca; arranged according to their organization. London, van Voorst. Vol. 1: xl + 484 pp.; vol. 2: 661 pp.; vol. 3: 138 pls
 Houbrick, R. S. (1990). Review of the genus Colina H. and A. Adams, 1854 (Cerithiidae: Prosobranchia). Nautilus. 104(2): 35-52

Cerithiidae